Gerald Lee McRaney (born August 19, 1947) is an American television and film actor. McRaney is best known as one of the stars of the television shows Simon & Simon, Major Dad, Promised Land and House of Cards. He currently stars as Admiral Hollace Kilbride on NCIS: Los Angeles. He was a series regular in the first season of Jericho and the final season of Deadwood. He appeared in a recurring role as main antagonist Mason Wood in season eight of Castle. Recently, he played Barlow Connally in the A&E series Longmire and had a recurring role in the NBC series This Is Us as Dr. Nathan Katowski, a role which earned him the Primetime Emmy Award for Outstanding Guest Actor in a Drama Series.

Early life
McRaney was born in Collins, Mississippi, the son of Clyde and Edna McRaney. He is of Scottish and Choctaw ancestry. He attended college at the University of Mississippi. Before finding success as an actor, McRaney worked in the Louisiana oil fields.

Career
In film, he starred in Night of Bloody Horror (1969), a low-budget slasher film in which he played the lead character Wesley Stuart.

On television, McRaney appeared in The Dukes of Hazzard in the episode "Hazzard Connection" (November 9, 1979), played a receptionist in two different episodes of The Rockford Files, and portrayed Tim Ryder, a heroin-addicted Vietnam War veteran in one episode of Hawaii Five-O. In addition, he starred in numerous episodes of The Incredible Hulk playing roles as a jealous boyfriend, a jealous race car driver, an angry police officer, and a disturbed police chief, and his miniseries roles include Dr. Henderson in Women in White (1979) and a town local, Harry Owens in Roots: The Next Generations (1979). However, McRaney is perhaps best known for his role as Rick Simon in the 1980s television show Simon & Simon. He also had starring roles in Major Dad and Promised Land, and a recurring role on Designing Women.

McRaney portrayed business mogul Adam Brock in the last eight episodes of Darren Star's primetime soap opera Central Park West, which ran on CBS in 1995–96. He later appeared as General Alan Adamle in two episodes of the NBC drama The West Wing; played a prominent role in the third season of the HBO television series Deadwood, as gold prospector George Hearst; and starred in the CBS postapocalyptic series Jericho as Johnston Green.

Additionally, he has acted in many television films, such as: Not Our Son (1995); Going for Broke (2003); and Ike: Countdown to D-Day (2004), as General George S. Patton. He also starred in an episode of CSI: Crime Scene Investigation (episode 9.24 "All In") and Diagnosis: Murder (episode 1.13 "Lily") as Det. Andy Ruggio.

In 1999, he starred in the film A Holiday Romance as Cal Peterson. In the late 2000s, McRaney co-hosted the cable outdoor hunting and shooting series The World of Beretta, drawing on his own sport interests. The series featured the sponsor's rifle and shotgun products in a number of hunting locations around the world, and often featured a celebrity shooter to hunt with McRaney.

In 2010, he starred as the villainous General Morrison in the film The A-Team (2010) and played a recurring role as CIA handler Carlton Shaw in the NBC action drama Undercovers. Also that year, he hosted a cable series on Spike TV that encouraged viewers Don't Be a Victim. One episode highlighted an instance wherein his lifelong friend and Simon & Simon costar Jameson Parker was shot twice.

In 2011, he began playing a recurring role as a judge on the US drama Fairly Legal. In 2012, McRaney played General Luntz in Red Tails, and Calvin in the film Heart of the Country. He made several appearances in a guest role on the television shows Longmire (2012–2015) and Mike & Molly (2012–2013). Later in 2013, he had a recurring role in the final season of Southland.

In 2013, 2014, 2016, and 2017, he appeared in the Netflix series House of Cards as the billionaire Raymond Tusk of an energy corporation specializing in nuclear power. He also made two appearances in a supporting role on the FX Network drama Justified. From 2012 to 2017 he played the wealthy, powerful real estate developer Barlow Connally on the A&E/Netflix series Longmire.

In 2015, he starred in the dark-comedy Focus as Bucky Spurgeon and in Coat of Many Colors as Rev. Jake Owens, Dolly Parton's maternal grandfather and preacher. In 2016, he appeared as main antagonist and recurring character Mason Wood (LockSat) during the eighth and final season of Castle.

In 2016, he began appearing in the NBC series This Is Us as Dr. Nathan Katowski, a role for which he won a Primetime Emmy Award.

Personal life

McRaney married his third wife, actress Delta Burke, on May 28, 1989; they had met two years earlier during her guest appearance on a Simon & Simon episode. He appeared on the series in which she starred, Designing Women, as Dash Goff (who was named after a real person from Fayetteville, Arkansas, whom Delta Burke's fellow castmate, Annie Potts, had met while filming Pass the Ammo on location).

In 1992, McRaney served as Bacchus in the Krewe of Bacchus at Mardi Gras in New Orleans, Louisiana.

Having played a Marine Corps veteran on Simon & Simon and a Marine Corps officer on Major Dad, he has always been very supportive of veterans and soldiers, although he is not a veteran himself. He made many visits to support the soldiers in Operation Desert Storm. During one USO-sponsored trip, McRaney visited sailors and Marines on board ships ported in Toulon, France, on Thanksgiving of 1993 and signed autographs for the men on board the ships. While on board the USS Ashland, he autographed one sailor's cowboy hat. He also visited troops during Operation Restore Hope in Somalia in 1993. In 1994 he visited troops of task force 1/87 deployed to Haiti for Operation Restore Democracy. McRaney chaired the Department of Veterans Affairs' 2002 National Salute to Hospitalized Veterans campaign, honoring hospitalized veterans and promoting volunteerism at VA medical center. He has appeared in commercials for the Wounded Warrior Project.

In August 2004, McRaney underwent successful surgery for lung cancer, in Houston, Texas.

Politics
Endorsing incumbent Republican President George H. W. Bush for re-election in 1992, McRaney stated: "Most of my life I've been a Democrat, but the last several presidential elections have finally convinced me that I might as well go ahead and admit I'm a Republican." His first presidential vote was for Democrat Hubert Humphrey in 1968. At the 1992 Republican National Convention, McRaney introduced Second Lady Marilyn Quayle.

In 2008, McRaney supported Republican candidate John McCain for president.

McRaney has appeared in TV commercials on behalf of the National Rifle Association dating back to 1987.

Filmography

Film

Television

References

External links

1947 births
Living people
People from Collins, Mississippi
American people of Choctaw descent
American people of Scottish descent
Male actors from Mississippi
American male film actors
American male television actors 
University of Mississippi alumni
20th-century American male actors
21st-century American male actors
Mississippi Republicans
Primetime Emmy Award winners